The Communist Party of Turkey/Marxist–Leninist (Maoist Party Centre) is a clandestine communist party in Turkey, currently waging a war against the Turkish government. It was founded in 1987 when it split form Communist Party of Turkey/Marxist–Leninist.

See also
Peoples' United Revolutionary Movement
Revolutionary People's Liberation Party/Front
United Freedom Forces

External links
Official website
Old website
İktidara (newspaper)

1987 establishments in Turkey
Communist militant groups
Communist parties in Turkey
Economic history of Turkey
Far-left politics in Turkey
Left-wing militant groups in Turkey
Maoist organizations in Turkey
Political parties established in 1987